Robert Timothy Bogue (born August 27, 1964 in Minden, Nebraska) is an American actor, who played A.C. Mallet on Guiding Light from 2005 until the soap's ending in 2009. He also plays FIB Agent Steve Haines in Grand Theft Auto V in 2013 and main protagonist Red Harlow in Red Dead Revolver in 2004.

Biography
Born in Minden, Nebraska as the youngest of three brothers, Bogue was raised in Hays, Kansas and Richmond, Kentucky. He graduated Phi Beta Kappa from Colorado College with a degree in International Political Economics. He was an original founding member of the New Group Theater Company. Bogue also voiced Red Harlow in the video games Red Dead Revolver and Red Dead Redemption, Troy in Grand Theft Auto: The Ballad of Gay Tony and Steve Haines in Grand Theft Auto V.

Personal life
He is divorced and has  two children from his first marriage:  Zebulon Jeremiah, born in 2003; and his daughter, Zoë Chinook, born in 2004. On March 26, 2011, he married his Guiding Light co-star Mandy Bruno. They have one child together, a son, Flynn Zachariah, born in 2012.
He holds a third degree black belt in "Traditional" Tae Kwon Do.

Filmography

Film

Television

Video games

References

External links

soapoperadigest.com/actors/robertbogue/
soapcentral.com/gl/theactors/bogue.php

1964 births
American male soap opera actors
American male stage actors
American male television actors
American male video game actors
Colorado College alumni
People from Hays, Kansas
People from Minden, Nebraska
People from Richmond, Kentucky
Male actors from New York City
Living people